BU09059 is a potent, selective, short-acting (non-"inactivating") antagonist of the κ-opioid receptor (KOR). It was derived from the irreversible (long-acting) KOR antagonist JDTic in search of an antagonist with a reversible profile of inactivation of the KOR that could be used with less concern to treat psychiatric disorders. In addition to its reversibility, BU09059 is much more selective for the KOR than JDTic, showing 15-fold and 616-fold preference for the KOR over the μ- and δ-opioid receptors (Ki = 1.72 nM, 26.5 nM, and 1060 nM, respectively).

See also 
 κ-Opioid receptor § Antagonists
 List of investigational antidepressants

References 

4-Phenylpiperidines
Kappa-opioid receptor antagonists
Mu-opioid receptor antagonists
Synthetic opioids
Tetrahydroisoquinolines